Lorna Byrne (born 25 March 1953) is an Irish author and peace ambassador. She is best known for her bestselling memoir, Angels in My Hair (2008). A Message of Hope from the Angels (2012) and Love from Heaven (2014) debuted at No. 1 on the UK Sunday Times Book Chart. Her books have been translated into 30 languages and published in over 50 countries. Byrne says that she sees angels and spirits physically on a daily, continuous basis. She has been featured in many media outlets, including the BBC, CNN, The Economist, The Observer, and the Daily Telegraph.

Biography

Early life 
Byrne was born in Dublin, and grew up in poverty in the Dublin suburbs of Kilmainham and Ballymun. She relates that she has seen angels since she was a baby. "I see angels physically and I have done so since I was a baby. I know this is hard to believe, and I know that there are some people who will never believe me, regardless of what I say or do. I have no idea why I see angels and others don’t; I am just an ordinary woman. When I have asked the angels around me about this, their reply has simply been "Why not you?" She was labeled as "retarded" when very young, and speculates that this might be because she was so often in her own world. Lorna's childhood was challenging for many reasons, including difficult family relations because Lorna was often observed as different resulting in something of an ‘outsider’ status. Despite a specific learning difficulty that makes it hard for someone to learn to read, write and spell correctly, as well as a misconception as to her learning capabilities, Lorna has achieved many things.

Marriage and children 
Byrne married Joe in 1976. She relates that when she was young an angel showed her a vision of the man she would marry, and told her they would be happy and have children, but that she would need to care for him and that he would die young. Their married life was spent in a cottage near Maynooth, in Co. Kildare. They had four children. As she conveys having been told, Joe was often in poor health, and he died in 2000.

Public life 
Byrne has said that the angels told her many years ago that she would write of them. "When I was a child the angels used to tell me I would write about God and them," she has said, "but I didn't use to take any notice of them… but even when Angel Michael said to me that it is getting near your time I was telling him, 'Stop pestering me. How does God expect me to write a book when I can't read or write at all?' He said help would be sent to me. And it was." "It filled me with fear of being laughed at and ridiculed," she has said. "But right from when I was a child the angels told me that my story would go all around the world, that it would be a bestseller, though they did not use those words."

Writing 
Angels in My Hair is a memoir of her early and married life. Stairways to Heaven (2010) is a memoir of life after the death of her husband, including the story of writing her first book and becoming a public figure. She states that it contains many details of how angels work in the world. A Message of Hope from the Angels is about the importance of hope "in these challenging times".

Love from Heaven (2014) introduced the topic of what she describes as a lack of love in the world today, and discusses the importance of loving oneself, which she says is necessary for being able to love others. She also stated for the first time that she sees the force of love as she does angels. The Year With Angels (2016) helps readers to recognise their spiritual side through the different seasons of the year, and includes photographs of Ireland in the four seasons. Angels at my Fingertips (2017) is a sequel to Angels in my Hair, containing descriptions of events throughout Byrne's life and taking her autobiographical writing up to 2017. It contains descriptions of visionary experiences of historical figures and detailed exercises for connecting to guardian angels.

A book on prayer, Prayers from the Heart, was published in 2018. This includes advice on how to pray, and prayers for many situations. My Guardian Angel, My Best Friend (2020) is a book of stories for children, inspired by real life, written to remind children they each have a guardian angel. Illustrations in the book are by Aideen Byrne, Lorna's daughter.

Byrne regularly writes a newsletter for e-mail subscribers and posts on Facebook, Twitter and Instagram and from 2013 till 2017 also blogged for The Huffington Post

Charitable work 
In 2015, Byrne established the Lorna Byrne Children's Foundation, which supports the work of charities helping children in need. Funds the Foundation raises are currently split between UNICEF Ireland, which is supporting children affected by the Syrian Civil War; APA — A Partnership with Africa, which supports the self-empowerment of women and children in Ethiopia and Tanzania; and in Limerick, Narrative 4, which uses the power of storytelling to grow empathy in children and help them improve their lives and communities, and the Children's Grief Centre, which supports children experiencing loss by bereavement of parental separation. From 2015 until 2017, Blue Box Creative Learning Centre, which provides art therapy was funded. Money is raised through public donations and speaking events.

Lorna Byrne and a group of friends, guided by the angels and shared values, have established a non-profit organisation named The Seraph Foundation. The mission of The Seraph Foundation is to create a Sanctuary for people from around the world, of all backgrounds and beliefs to come together, promote religious & social tolerance, inspire hope, encourage mindfulness & wellbeing while developing spiritually, guided by the teachings of Lorna Byrne and the Angels.

Travel and peace work 
Since becoming a well-known author, Byrne has engaged in book tours, and has spoken in other contexts to many public audiences across Europe and the United States.

She has travelled repeatedly to the United States, a country she believes is pivotal in the future of the world.  In 2011, Byrne expressed her support for Occupy Wall Street. In 2014, she attended the UN Climate Summit and the People's Climate March. In 2014 and 2015, much of her work was devoted to fostering unity between Sunni and Shia Muslims in America, which Byrne believes is important in influencing American foreign policy in the Middle East.  In February 2014, the Nobel Peace Prize laureate Betty Williams joined Byrne at the Sufi Mosque at Tribeca for a prayer event for unity among Muslims.

Media appearances in the United States have included a 2012 interview on CNN, and interviews in 2010 and 2012 on Coast to Coast AM with George Noory.

Byrne has travelled to be a subject in two full-scale documentaries: the American production The Lady Who Sees Angels, which was directed by Ted Yacucci and released in 2015; and, to raise funds for the Lorna Byrne Children's Foundation, an Irish production filmed in Ethiopia, The Future belongs to the Young, directed by Hugh Chaloner and released in 2017.

In 2014 she stated that the war in Syria had the potential to spread, and poses a great danger to the rest of the world.  She has organised a day of prayer for peace in Syria.

Views and beliefs

Spiritual views and beliefs 
Byrne says that she sees physically and communicates with angels on a day-to-day basis. She most strongly emphasizes, and is best known to the public for saying, that everyone regardless of belief has a guardian angel, who loves the person they protect, never leaves their side for an even a moment, and can be asked for help. The guardian angel can also allow other angels to help the person in their life.

Some of the angels Byrne has written about talking to are those of the Abrahamic religions: for example, Michael, Gabriel, and Elijah. However, she emphasizes that the angels appear to her in forms she would be comfortable with as a Catholic, and that they would appear to people from other cultures and religions in forms that would be comfortable for them. She has said that she has seen Archangel Gabriel dressed as "what we might call today," a biker.

In Love from Heaven, she stated that most people lock the love they have inside them. She writes that it is vital to love oneself, and that one is unable to love others if one does not love oneself.

Byrne states that all religions have access to God, and no person should think theirs better than the others. She maintains that God and the angels would like all religions to worship together, each according to their own understanding, none trying to convert the others. "It needs to become normal for all of us, regardless of our education, our status in life or our method or place of prayer, to come together with open hearts — without any agenda — to pray to God in whatever way feels appropriate to us."

She has talked and written about the importance and power of prayer, and of recognising hope in the world and in everyone's own lives.

Views on public matters 
Inspired by what she says angels have told her, Byrne has expressed views on matters of public concern.

She has made statements on the environment, saying that, "Far too many decisions that affect our environment are tainted by greed and lobbying of special interests. We are all required to stand up and to make sure our leaders at neighbourhood, community, regional, national and international level know we care about this planet and our environment, and will hold them accountable."

The underpinning for activity to protect the environment should be love: "We all need to wake up and be more aware of the beauty and the gifts of nature that surround us. If we do not appreciate and love nature's incredible beauty, there is no way we will be prepared to do what is required to protect it."

Byrne has said that particular attention should be paid to repairing the damage to the ozone layer. Failure to do so will make other challenges such as combating poverty and disease much harder. The means by which this challenge is met are important: "It will not be solved if people are just out for themselves or wish to make unjust profit out of the process."

She has also expressed opposition to fracking in all circumstances. She believes trees should be planted in very large numbers, as a long-term contribution to the environment.

Byrne has written that children have birthrights which should be upheld, among them the rights "to be a child", "to be treated equally", "to have food and water", "to breathe clean air", "to be born into a peaceful world", "to a full education", "to full medical care". To these ends, individuals need to "stand up for children and demand that our government, leaders and international institutions do the right thing by children, and hold these authorities to account if they don't".

Reception 
Reaction to Byrne's statement that she sees angels and spirits has been varied, ranging from scepticism and disbelief to belief and endorsement.

In 2009, Tariq Ramadan recommended Angels in My Hair in Foreign Policy. In 2014, Byrne met and was endorsed by the theologian Matthew Fox. John L. Esposito, professor of International Relations and Islamic Studies at Georgetown University, said, "A Message of Hope from the Angels offers a message of hope that speaks to the crises and everyday problems that many struggle with in today’s world."  John Carty, an endorphin release therapist, said Byrne's ability to see energy in the human body has helped him in his work.

Larry Dossey, MD., NY Times bestselling author, writes, "Since recorded history, certain individuals have sensed, seen, and conversed with angelic presences. Since we are appallingly ignorant about the nature of consciousness, it is premature to dismiss these reports as fantasies, which is too often done.  Lorna Byrne’s ‘Angels in my Hair’ is captivating. It is both a challenge to skeptics and an inspiration to those whose experiences confirm transcendental realities."

Michael Alper, author of The "God" Part of the Brain, related his opinion in 2012, "Either a) she actually believes it, or b) she is a complete charlatan. There is no option c) – that she would be talking to angels. Human beings are simply genetically predisposed to believe in some kind of spiritual reality."

Byrne's response to her critics is often a reminder of free will: "I am not here to force anyone to believe, or say you have to listen, but maybe you should listen to me and open to the possibility that you really do have a guardian angel."

Books 
 2008 Angels in my Hair. London: Century. 
 2010 Stairways to Heaven. London: Coronet. 
 2012 A Message of Hope from the Angels. London: Coronet. 
 2014 Love from Heaven. London: Coronet. 
 2016 The Year With Angels. London: Coronet. 
 2017 Angels at my Fingertips. London: Coronet. 
 2018 Prayers from the Heart. London: Coronet. 
 2020 My Guardian Angel, My Best Friend: Stories for children (illustrations by Aideen Byrne). London: Coronet.

References

External links 
 

1953 births
Living people
Angelic visionaries
Writers from Dublin (city)
People from Maynooth